Zamia amplifolia is a species of plant in the family Zamiaceae. It is endemic to the Calima River watershed of Valle del Cauca Department, Colombia.  It is threatened by habitat loss.

References

amplifolia
Endemic flora of Colombia
Critically endangered plants
Taxonomy articles created by Polbot